is a passenger railway station located in the city of  Funabashi, Chiba Prefecture, Japan, operated by the private railway operator Shin-Keisei Electric Railway.

Lines
Narashino Station is served by the Shin-Keisei Line, and is located 21.7 kilometers from the terminus of the line at Matsudo Station.

Station layout 
The station consists of two opposed side platforms, connected to the station building by a footbridge.

Platforms

History
Narashino Station was opened on October 8, 1948.

Passenger statistics
In fiscal 2018, the station was used by an average of 13,360 passengers daily.

Surrounding area
 Funabashi City Eastern Health Center
 Funabashi City Higashi Library
 Funabashi City Folk Museum

See also
 List of railway stations in Japan

References

External links

 Shin Keisei Railway Station information 

Railway stations in Japan opened in 1948
Railway stations in Chiba Prefecture
Funabashi